The Aguas Calientes Hot Springs (Spanish: Termas de Aguas Calientes) is a series of hot springs located 76 kilometers near Route 215-CH east of Osorno in Los Lagos Region of southern Chile.

The area is served by Refugio del Lago Airport.

Nearby attractions include Puyehue Hot Springs and the Antillanca ski resort.

See also
Puyehue National Park
Osorno Province
Puyehue Lake
Puyehue-Cordón Caulle
Rupanco Lake

References

Geology of Los Lagos Region
Hot springs of Chile
Tourist attractions in Los Lagos Region